Beda Mayr (15 January 1742-28 April 1794) was a Bavarian Benedictine philosopher, apologist, and poet.

References

German Benedictines
1742 births
1794 deaths